John Albert Ashley (13 October 1912 – 1992) was an English professional footballer who played in the Football League for Mansfield Town and Sheffield Wednesday.

References

1912 births
1992 deaths
English footballers
Association football defenders
English Football League players
Notts County F.C. players
Bolsover Colliery F.C. players
Shirebrook Miners Welfare F.C. players
Mansfield Town F.C. players
Sheffield Wednesday F.C. players